Johann Gustav Wilhelm Moritz Heckscher (born 26 December 1797 in Hamburg; died 7 April 1865 in Vienna) was a German politician.

Biography
He served during the War of 1815 as a volunteer in the Hanseatic Corps, and then studied at the universities of Göttingen and Heidelberg. Upon completing his studies he settled in Hamburg, where he practiced law, and, after 1840, directed the politics of the Hamburger Nachrichten. In 1848 he was elected to the Vorparlament, in which he opposed the propositions of the Democratic Party. In the Frankfurt Parliament proper (1848–49), he was at first a member of the left center, but gradually inclined to identify himself with the right. He advocated the election of Archduke John of Austria as vicar of the provisional national government (Reichsverweser), in which he himself was appointed minister of justice, and opposed the proposition to exclude Austria and erect a German empire with a Prussian king as hereditary emperor. Later he helped to organize the Pan-German Party.

See also
August Heckscher, his son.
August Heckscher II, his great-grandson.

Notes

References
 

1797 births
1865 deaths
Members of the Frankfurt Parliament
University of Göttingen alumni
Heidelberg University alumni